Tumacacori is an unincorporated community in Santa Cruz County, Arizona, United States, which abuts the community of Carmen. Together, the communities constitute the Tumacacori-Carmen census-designated place (CDP). The population of the CDP was 393 at the 2010 census.

History

Tumacacori is the site of Mission San José de Tumacácori, a Franciscan mission that was built in the late 18th century. It takes its name from an earlier mission site founded by Father Eusebio Kino in 1691, which is on the east side of the Santa Cruz River, south of the national park. This Kino-period mission was founded at an extant native O'odham or Sobaipuri settlement and represents the first mission in southern Arizona, but not the first mission in Arizona. The remains of the native settlement are still extant and have been investigated and reported on by archaeologist Deni Seymour.

The later Franciscan mission, which is now a ruin preserved as Tumacácori National Historical Park, was never rebuilt after being abandoned after repeated Apache raids in the 19th century that killed farmers and ranchers in the area and put a stop to the growth of the area's economy. Nearby Tubac was besieged in 1861.

Geography
Tumacacori is located at  (31.561157, -111.047810).

The locale is in a valley cut by the Santa Cruz River.

Climate
Tumacacori has a semi-arid climate (Köppen: BSk) with cool winters and hot summers.

Demographics

As of the census of 2000, there were 569 people, 223 households, and 152 families residing in the CDP. The racial makeup of the CDP was 77.0% White, 0.2% Black or African American, 1.0% Native American, 1.8% Asian, 17.6% from other races, and 2.6% from two or more races. 58.0% of the population were Hispanic or Latino of any race.

There were 223 households, out of which 26.5% had children under the age of 18 living with them, 52.9% were married couples living together, 9.9% had a female householder with no husband present, and 31.8% were non-families. 27.8% of all households were made up of individuals, and 9.9% had someone living alone who was 65 years of age or older. The average household size was 2.55, and the average family size was 3.13.

In the CDP, the population was spread out, with 23.7% under the age of 18, 7.7% from 18 to 24, 26.0% from 25 to 44, 28.6% from 45 to 64, and 13.9% who were 65 years of age or older. The median age was 41 years. For every 100 females, there were 96.9 males. For every 100 females age 18 and over, there were 96.4 males.

The median income for a household in the CDP was $35,938, and the median income for a family was $36,250. Males had a median income of $26,806 versus $18,594 for females. The per capita income for the CDP was $18,607. About 10.1% of families and 10.8% of the population were below the poverty line, including none of those under age 18 and 26.3% of those age 65 or over.

Historic structures of Tumacacori
These are images of historic structures in Tumacacori. Included are images of the inside of the Tumacacori Mission and images of the Cemetery grounds. Also, pictured are artifacts of historical significance on display in the historic Tumacacori National Park Museum, some of which were once used by the Franciscan missionaries in the Mission San José de Tumacácori.

Tumacacori National Park Museum

See also

 List of census-designated places in Arizona
 Julie Chen (book artist), founder of Flying Fish Press
 Mission San José de Tumacácori
 Sonoita Creek

References

Further reading
 Di Peso, Charles C. The Upper Pima of San Cayetano del Tumacacori: An Archaeohistorical Reconstruction of the Ootam of Pimeria Alta, Dragoon: Amerind Foundation, 1956
 Dobyns, Henry F. Tubac Through Four Centuries: A Historical Resume and Analysis. Prepared for the Arizona State Parks Board 15 March 1959, reformatted by Tubac Presidio State Historical Park, August 1995 and revised. Available online at Tubac Through Four Centuries | Through Our Parents' Eyes
 Doyel, D. E. Excavations in the Middle Santa Cruz River Valley, Southeastern Arizona. Contribution to Highway Salvage Archaeology in Arizona, Number 44. Tucson: Arizona State Museum, U of Arizona, 1977.
 Seymour, Deni J.:
 Piman Settlement Survey in the Middle Santa Cruz River Valley, Santa Cruz County, Arizona, report submitted to Arizona State Parks in fulfillment of survey and planning grant contract requirements, 1993.
 Delicate Diplomacy on a Restless Frontier: Seventeenth-Century Sobaípuri Social And Economic Relations in Northwestern New Spain, Part I. New Mexico Historical Review, Volume 82, no. 4, 2007.
 A Syndetic Approach to Identification of the Historic Mission Site of San Cayetano del Tumacácori. International Journal of Historical Archaeology, Vol. 11(3):269–296, 2007.
 Delicate Diplomacy on a Restless Frontier: Seventeenth-Century Sobaípuri Social And Economic Relations in Northwestern New Spain, Part II. New Mexico Historical Review, Volume 83, no. 2, 2008.

External links

Census-designated places in Santa Cruz County, Arizona
Populated places in the Sonoran Desert
Census-designated places in Arizona
Cemeteries in Arizona